was the 69th emperor of Japan, according to the traditional order of succession.

Go-Suzaku's reign spanned the years from 1036 through 1045.

This 11th-century sovereign was named after the 10th-century Emperor Suzaku and go- (後), translates literally as "later;" and thus, he is sometimes called the "Later Emperor Suzaku". The Japanese word "go" has also been translated to mean the "second one;" and in some older sources, this emperor may be identified as "Suzaku, the second" or as "Suzaku II."

Biography
Before his ascension to the Chrysanthemum Throne, his personal name (his imina) was Atsunaga-shinnō (敦良親王).

His father was Emperor Ichijō.  His mother was Fujiwara no Akiko/Shōshi (藤原彰子), the daughter of Fujiwara no Michinaga (藤原道長).  He was the younger brother and heir to Emperor Go-Ichijō.

Go-Suzaku had five Empresses and seven Imperial children.

Events of Go-Suzaku's life
 May 15, 1036 (Chōgen 9, 17th day of the 4th month) : In the 9th year of Emperor Go-Ichijō's reign (後一条天皇九年), he died; and the succession (‘‘senso’’) was received by his son.
 1036 (Chōgen 9, 7th month): Emperor Go-Suzaku is said to have acceded to the throne (‘‘sokui’’).
 February 5, 1045 (Kantoku 2, 16th day of the 1st month): Emperor Go-Suzaku abdicated.
 February 7, 1045 (Kantoku 2, 18th day of the 1st month): The former-Emperor Go-Suzaku ordained as a Buddhist monk and died the same day at the age of 37.  His reign has lasted nine years—five in the nengō Chōryaku, four in Chōkyu, and 2 in Kantoku.

The actual site of Go-Suzaku's grave is unknown.  This emperor is traditionally venerated at a memorial Shinto shrine (misasagi) at Kyoto.

The Imperial Household Agency designates this location as Go-Suzaku's mausoleum.  It is formally named Enjō-ji no misasagi.

Go-Suzaku is buried amongst the "Seven Imperial Tombs" at Ryōan-ji Temple in Kyoto.

The specific mound which commemorates the Hosokawa Emperor Go-Suzaku is today named Shu-zan.

The emperor's burial place would have been quite humble in the period after Go-Suzaku died.

These tombs reached their present state as a result of the 19th century restoration of imperial sepulchers (misasagi) which were ordered by Emperor Meiji.

The final resting place of Emperor Go-Suzaku's consort, Teishi Nai-shinnō (1013–1094), is here as well.

Kugyō
 is a collective term for the very few most powerful men attached to the court of the Emperor of Japan in pre-Meiji eras. Even during those years in which the court's actual influence outside the palace walls was minimal, the hierarchic organization persisted.

In general, this elite group included only three to four men at a time.  These were hereditary courtiers whose experience and background would have brought them to the pinnacle of a life's career.  During Go-Suzaku's reign, this apex of the Daijō-kan included: 
 Sadaijin, Fujiwara Yorimichi, 992–1074.
 Udaijin, Fujiwara Sanesuke, 957–1046.
 Nadaijin, Fujiwara Norimichi, 997–1075.
 Dainagon

Eras of Go-Suzaku's reign
The years of Go-Suzaku's reign are more specifically identified by more than one era name or nengō.
 Chōgen      (1028–1037)
 Chōryaku  (1037–1040)
 Chōkyū      (1040–1044)
 Kantoku            (1044–1046)

Consorts and children
Empress (kōgō): Imperial Princess Teishi (禎子内親王; 1013–1094) later Yōmeimon’in (陽明門院), Emperor Sanjō‘s 3rd daughter
 First Daughter: Imperial Princess Nagako/Ryōshi (良子内親王, 1029–1077) – Saiō at Ise Shrine 1036–1045 (Ippon-Jusangū, 一品准三宮)
 Second daughter: Imperial Princess Yoshiko/Kenshi (娟子内親王, 1032–1103) – Saiin at Kamo Shrine 1036–1045, later married Minamoto Toshifusa
 Second Son: Imperial Prince Takahito (尊仁親王) later Emperor Go-Sanjo

Empress (chūgū): Fujiwara no Genshi (藤原嫄子; 1016–1039), Imperial Prince Atsuyasu's daughter and Fujiwara no Yorimichi‘s adopted daughter
 Third Daughter: Imperial Princess Sukeko/Yūshi (祐子内親王; 1038–1105) – (Sanpon-Jusangū, 三品准三宮)
 Fourth Daughter: Imperial Princess Miwako/Baishi (禖子内親王; 1039–1096) (Rokujō Saiin, 六条斎院) – Saiin at Kamo Shrine 1046–1058

Crown Princess (died before Emperor's accession): Fujiwara no Yoshiko (藤原嬉子; 1007-1025), Fujiwara no Michinaga‘s 6th daughter 
 First Son: Imperial Prince Chikahito (親仁親王) later Emperor Go-Reizei

Consort (Nyōgo): Fujiwara no Nariko/Seishi (藤原生子; 1014–1068), Fujiwara no Norimichi‘s eldest daughter

Consort (Nyōgo): Fujiwara no Nobuko/Enshi (藤原延子; 1016–1095), Fujiwara no Yorimune‘s 2nd daughter
 Fifth Daughter: Imperial Princess Masako/Seishi (正子内親王; 1045–1114) (Oshinokōji-Saiin, 押小路斎院) – Saiin at Kamo Shrine 1058–1069

Ancestry

Notes

References
 Brown, Delmer M. and Ichirō Ishida, eds. (1979).  Gukanshō: The Future and the Past. Berkeley: University of California Press. ; 
 Moscher, Gouverneur. (1978). Kyoto: A Contemplative Guide. ; 
 Ponsonby-Fane, Richard Arthur Brabazon. (1959).  The Imperial House of Japan. Kyoto: Ponsonby Memorial Society. 
 Titsingh, Isaac. (1834). Nihon Odai Ichiran; ou,  Annales des empereurs du Japon.  Paris: Royal Asiatic Society, Oriental Translation Fund of Great Britain and Ireland. 
 Varley, H. Paul. (1980). Jinnō Shōtōki: A Chronicle of Gods and Sovereigns. New York: Columbia University Press. ;

See also
 Emperor of Japan
 List of Emperors of Japan
 Imperial cult

 
 

Japanese emperors
1009 births
1045 deaths
11th-century Japanese monarchs
Heian period Buddhist clergy
People of Heian-period Japan
Japanese Buddhist monarchs
Japanese retired emperors
People from Kyoto